Kitwanga Mountain Provincial Park is a provincial park in British Columbia, Canada located on the north side of the Skeena River just west of the Gitxsan community of Kitwanga (Gitwangak).

The park was established on July 23, 1997 and is approximately 720 ha. in size.

See also
Kitwanga Fort National Historic Site

References
BC Parks website "Kitwanga Mountain Provincial Park"

Provincial parks of British Columbia
Skeena Country
1997 establishments in British Columbia
Protected areas established in 1997